Sprouston railway station served the village of Sprouston, Scottish Borders, Scotland, from 1849 to 1965 on the Kelso Branch.

History 
The station opened on 27 July 1849 by the York, Newcastle and Berwick Railway. It was situated on an unnamed road on the B6350. An engine shed was built in 1863 but it was destroyed in a gale in 1881. A replacement was quickly built by the NER but it was built out of brick instead of timber. Initially, there were four sidings to the northeast as well as a coal and lime depot. One of the sidings served a goods shed which was behind the station. A signal box opened in the 1880s but it was replaced in 1912 with a new one on the downside. On 1 March 1940 it was downgraded to a ground frame. The engine shed closed in 1916 as a wartime economy measure but it wasn't demolished until the 1960s. The last train called at the station on 2 July 1955 but official passenger closure happened two days later on 4 July 1955. It remained open for goods until 25 January 1965.

References

External links 

Disused railway stations in West Lothian
Former North Eastern Railway (UK) stations
Railway stations in Great Britain opened in 1849
Railway stations in Great Britain closed in 1955
1849 establishments in Scotland
1965 disestablishments in Scotland